Stefan Poutsma (born 10 September 1991) is a Dutch former professional racing cyclist, who rode professionally for  from 2012 to 2016. He rode at the 2013 UCI Road World Championships.

Major results

2012
 3rd Overall Tour de Berlin
 9th Kernen Omloop Echt-Susteren
2013
 1st Overall Carpathian Couriers Race
1st Stage 3
 1st Omloop van de Schermer
2014
 1st Lus Van Roden
 1st Stage 2 (TTT) Olympia's Tour
 4th Overall Okolo Jižních Čech
2015
 1st Stage 1a (TTT) Olympia's Tour
 1st Stage 2 Dookoła Mazowsza
 1st Mountains classification Ronde van Midden-Nederland
 4th Overall Podlasie Tour
1st Stage 2
 8th Dorpenomloop Rucphen
 8th Omloop Het Nieuwsblad U23
 9th GP Horsens
2016
 10th ZODC Zuidenveld Tour

References

External links

1991 births
Living people
Dutch male cyclists
People from Noordenveld
Cyclists from Drenthe
21st-century Dutch people